Rice Lake is a lake in Pope County, in the U.S. state of Minnesota.

Rice Lake was named for the wild rice harvested there.

See also
List of lakes in Minnesota

References

Lakes of Minnesota
Lakes of Pope County, Minnesota